Ernst Öbster  (born March 17, 1984) is an Austrian footballer who plays for SV Friedburg.

Career

Club
Öbster began his youth career with SK Bischofshofen and in 2001 joined BNZ Salzburg. After impressing with BNZ, Öbster was called up by the SV Austria Salzburg first team and debuted in the Austrian Bundesliga as a 17-year-old. After receiving limited playing time with Salzburg, Öbster was loaned to  LASK Linz in 2003, during his time with Linz he was a regular starter as a left-sided midfielder appearing in 28 matches and notching 2 goals. After an impressive season with Linz, Öbster returned to SV Austria Salzburg and was a key reserve for the club. In 2005, SV Austria Salzburg was acquired by Red Bull and Öbster remained with the first team appearing in 7 league matches. Over the next few years he would alternate between the first team and Red Bull Juniors playing in the Austrian Football First League, in which he appeared in 30 matches scoring 9 goals. In the 2008–09 season Öbster appeared in 5 league matches and 4 UEFA Cup qualification matches in which he scored 2 goals. He also appeared in 3 Austrian Cup matches scoring 1 goal.

Following the season it was believed that Rapid Vienna was interested in signing Öbster, however he elected to join sister club New York Red Bulls agreeing to terms on July 14, 2009. He scored for New York on his debut July 30, 2009 in the first leg of the CONCACAF Champions League series with W Connection which ended in a 2–2 draw

Öbster was released by New York Red Bulls on March 24, 2010. Following his release from New York Öbster returned to Austria and signed with Wacker Innsbruck.

International
Internationally he has played eleven times for the Austrian U-21 national team.  In 2003, he took part in the U-19 European Championship and helped Austria reach the semifinals.

Titles

MLS Statistics

External links
MLS player profile
Interest from Rapid 
LASK Linz statistics 
 Ernst Öbster Interview

References

1984 births
Living people
Austrian footballers
Austria under-21 international footballers
Austrian expatriate footballers
FC Red Bull Salzburg players
Austrian Football Bundesliga players
New York Red Bulls players
LASK players
Expatriate soccer players in the United States
Major League Soccer players
Association football midfielders